Denver Davison (1891–1983), often written as Denver N. Davison, was born October 9, 1891 in Rich Hill, Missouri. He moved to the Choctaw Nation in Indian Territory in 1906 to work in the coal mines there. He earned a law degree from the University of Oklahoma in 1915, and entered private practice, until he was appointed to the Oklahoma Supreme Court in 1937. When he died at age 91 on April 28, 1983, he had served for over 41 years, longer on the Oklahoma Supreme Court than any other justice until that time. He had also served an unprecedented three terms as chief justice.

Education and early career 
Davison reportedly attended high school in Kansas City, Missouri, then studied at the University of Missouri for two years.  During this time, he also worked in Kansas coal mines until he moved to Bokoshe, Oklahoma in 1906, where it was said that he was paid $1.07 per day. During World War I, he served for 18 months in the Army Signal Corps. After discharge, he became a charter member of the Coalgate American Legion Post.

He received a law degree from Oklahoma University (OU) in 1915. After graduating from OU, he moved to Lehigh, Oklahoma, where he practiced law and published the Lehigh News. Later he moved to Coalgate, Oklahoma. He practiced law there for 12 years and also served as county attorney. He then moved to Ada, where he practiced law for another 10 years.

Oklahoma Supreme Court 
Davison was appointed as an associate justice of the Oklahoma Supreme Court by Governor E. W. Marland on August 7, 1937. During his tenure, he was retained five times to serve as a Justice.

Justice Davison retired from the court in 1978. Judge Rudolph Hargrave was appointed to succeed him.

Organization memberships
 Alpha Tau Omega, legal fraternity, Coalgate, Oklahoma
 B.P.O.E. (Elks); Coalgate
 Oak Hills Country Club; Ada
 American Legion (Ada Post)

Death 
Davison died on April 29, 1983. Survivors included his second wife, Lillian (nee Wright);  daughter-in-law, Susan N. Cason, grandchildren, Denver N. Davison and Trigg Yerby (all of Ada), Celeste Barringer ( of Ardmore)and Robert Cason (of Norman). His only son, Captain Denver B. Davison, was killed in WWII.

Davison's funeral was held at Crown Heights United Methodist Church in Oklahoma City, and he was interred at Rosedale Cemetery in Ada.

Legacy 
Davison was an original member of the Will Rogers Memorial Commission and is credited with obtaining the Rogers family's approval of the memorial building.
An office building constructed on the Oklahoma City capitol complex has been named for Denver Davison.

Notes

References 

1891 births
1983 deaths
People from Kansas City, Missouri
Chief Justices of the Oklahoma Supreme Court
University of Missouri alumni
University of Oklahoma College of Law alumni
People from Ada, Oklahoma
People from Coal County, Oklahoma
People from Le Flore County, Oklahoma
District attorneys in Oklahoma
20th-century American newspaper publishers (people)
People from Bates County, Missouri
United States Army personnel of World War I
Military personnel from Missouri
20th-century American judges